The 2001 Census of India was the 14th in a series of censuses held in India every decade since 1871.

The population of India was counted as 1,028,737,436 consisting of 532,223,090 males and 496,514,346 females. Total population increased by 182,310,397, 21.5% more than the 846,427,039 people counted during the 1991 census.

Religious demographics
Hindus comprise 82.75 crore (80.45%) and Muslims were 13.8 crore (13.4%) in 2001 census. Census 2001 showed 108 faiths under the head "Other Religions and Persuasion" (ORP) in India. 700,000 people did not state their religion.

Language demographics

Hindi is the most widely spoken language in northern parts of India. The Indian census takes the widest possible definition of "Hindi" as a broad variety of "Hindi languages". According to 2001 Census, 53.6% of Indian population know Hindi, in which 41% of them have declared Hindi as their native language or mother tongue. English is known to 12.18% Indians in the 2001 census. The number of bilingual speakers in India is 25.50 crore, which is 24.8% of the population in 2001. India (780) has the world's second highest number of languages, after Papua New Guinea (839).

Graphical summaries

See also
 1991 Census of India
 2011 Census of India
 Demographics of India

References

External links

Census of India, 2001
Censuses in India
Political history of India
India